Rogers Creek is a stream in Carter and Shannon counties in the Ozarks of southeast Missouri. It is a tributary of the Current River.

Rogers Creek most likely was named after John Rogers, a pioneer settler.

See also
List of rivers of Missouri

References

Rivers of Carter County, Missouri
Rivers of Shannon County, Missouri
Rivers of Missouri
Tributaries of the Current River (Ozarks)